Roger David Nussbaum (born 29 January 1944, in Philadelphia) is an American mathematician, specializing in nonlinear functional analysis and differential equations.

Nussbaum graduated in 1965 with a bachelor's degree from Harvard University. He received his Ph.D. in 1969 from the University of Chicago with thesis The Fixed Point Index and Fixed Point Theorems for K-Set Contractions supervised by Felix Browder. At Rutgers University Nussbaum became in 1969 an assistant professor, in 1973 an associate professor, and in 1977 a full professor. He retired there as professor emeritus. He was elected in 2012 a Fellow of the American Mathematical Society.

Selected publications

Articles
 
 
 
 
 
 
 
 
 
  (over 600 citations)
  (over 1100 citations)

Books
with Bas Lemmens: Nonlinear Perron-Frobenius Theory, Cambridge Tracts in Mathematics, Cambridge University Press 2012
with S. M. Verduyn-Lunel: Generalizations of the Perron-Frobenius Theorem for Nonlinear Maps, Memoirs AMS 1999
with Patrick Fitzpatrick, Jean Mawhin, Mario Martelli: Topological Methods for Ordinary Differential Equations, CIME Lectures, Montecacini Terme 1991, Lecture Notes in Mathematics 1537, Springer Verlag 1993
Hilbert's projective metric and iterated nonlinear maps, 2 vols., AMS 1988
Differential-delay equations with two time lags, Memoirs AMS 1978

References

20th-century American mathematicians
21st-century American mathematicians
Harvard University alumni
University of Chicago alumni
Rutgers University faculty
Fellows of the American Mathematical Society
1944 births
Living people